Ethel Carow Derby ( Roosevelt; August 13, 1891 – December 10, 1977) was the youngest daughter and fourth child of the President of the United States Theodore Roosevelt. Known as "The Queen" or "The First Lady of Oyster Bay" by its Long Island residents, Ethel was instrumental in preserving both the legacy of her father as well as the family home, "Sagamore Hill" for future generations, especially after the death of her mother, Edith, in 1948.

Early years

Ethel Carow Roosevelt was born in Oyster Bay, New York to Theodore Roosevelt and Edith Kermit Carow. She had a half-sister Alice, and four brothers; Ted (Theodore III), Kermit, Archie, and Quentin. From an early age, young Ethel Carow showed practical leadership qualities. Her father once remarked: "she had a way of doing everything and managing everybody." She quickly made her place in the family, causing upsets in her numerous fights with the sensitive Kermit. Her sensitivity also showed. When she was four, her father was reprimanding Kermit by shaking his shoulder; Ethel, with tears in her eyes said, "Shake me, Father."

She was thought to have resembled somewhat her older first-cousin, Eleanor Roosevelt. They each had soft, blue eyes, golden-blond hair but Ethel lacked Eleanor's height and had a heavier build in her waistline than did Eleanor. Many in the Roosevelt family thought her capable and charming, determined personality to be like that of her Aunt Bamie Cowles.

At Sagamore Hill, Ethel aggressively took part in all the games, and especially enjoyed horseback riding with her mother. Like her mother, she enjoyed needlework, and easily managed the younger children.

White House years

In the White House, Ethel often filled in for her mother by placing meal orders and delegating tasks to the staff. She was only 10 years old when her father became President after William McKinley's assassination in 1901.

During her family's years in the White House, Ethel always tried to keep as low a profile possible because she did not seem to enjoy the attention as much as her half-sister Alice Roosevelt did. She was also encouraged to maintain her low-key persona by her mother Edith, who believed that a woman only made the news to announce her birth, marriage and death. Ethel attended school at the National Cathedral and had difficulty making friends due to her father's position. Just months before the Roosevelts' departure from the White House, Ethel had her Debut and Coming Out Party in the White House on December 28, 1908. Ethel was just 17 at the time of her debut, one year shy of the typical age of 18 that most women "came out." The reason for this being the fact that the family was due to leave the White House less than three months following Ethel's debut. This would be last opportunity to do so if Ethel was to "come out" from Pennsylvania Avenue.

Service

During World War I, Ethel, now a nurse, served in France in the same hospital where her husband served as a surgeon. Later, she became involved with the Red Cross, and served as Nassau County Chairman during World War II, and then as Chairman of the Nassau County Nursing Service. Her long involvement, even while traveling, is shown by her correspondence still residing in the Nassau County Red Cross archives. When the Red Cross brought her Fifty Year Service Pin to Sagamore Hill, they had to correct themselves—it was not fifty years of service, it was sixty. When it came time to have her portrait painted, she did not choose to wear an evening gown and jewels, she wore her Red Cross uniform. She put in many years of work to turn Sagamore Hill into a National Historic Site. She was one of the first two women to serve on the Board of Trustees of the American Museum of Natural History.

Marriage and family
On April 4, 1913, she married Richard Derby, a surgeon. Mrs. Derby helped his efforts in France during World War I where she served as a nurse in the American Ambulance Hospital. Ethel was the first of T.R.'s children to serve in the war.

Ethel's marriage produced four children: 
Richard Derby Jr. (1914–1922) who died at age eight of sepsis
Edith Roosevelt Derby (1917–2008) who married Andrew Murray "Mike" Williams and resided until her death in Washington state on Vashon Island and in Seattle.
Sarah Alden Derby (1920–1999), who married Vermont State Senator Robert T. Gannett. 
Judith Quentin Derby (1923–1973) who married Adelbert "Del" Ames III.

All of the children were raised in Oyster Bay, where Ethel was regarded as a church and community leader earning her the nickname "Queen of Oyster Bay".

Later life and death
In her later years, Derby devoted more time to the American Civil Rights Movement, a cause she had long been devoted to. She worked on a smaller scale, though no less committed than her first-cousin, Eleanor Roosevelt and believed in solving local problems before working nationally.

When she felt Black residents were being discriminated against, Derby formed a committee to bring low-income housing into Oyster Bay. The proposal initially was rebuffed by most of the residents. Ethel had her friends meet at her house where she convinced them that this was a good idea and the housing project was successfully completed. A large number of Black people continue to reside in these areas Mrs. Derby helped to build.

In 1960, she along with her daughter Edith, made a seconding speech for the nomination of Richard Nixon at the Republican National Convention.

By 1975, Derby was in visibly weak condition. In 1977 she made her final visit to the White House to see Jimmy Carter and his wife Rosalynn. Finally, in December, 1977, she died at the Adam-Derby House in Oyster Bay, New York, aged 86 years; she was buried in the nearby Youngs Memorial Cemetery where her parents, husband and other relatives are also buried. She was survived by her two daughters, Edith and Sarah (both now deceased), nine grandchildren (one of whom has died) and two siblings, Archie Roosevelt and Alice Longworth who both are now deceased.

Miscellaneous

The  Adam-Derby House that Ethel Derby occupied from 1913–1977 was added to the National Register of Historic Places May 17, 1979.
Ethel Derby's niece, Susan Roosevelt Weld who was an admirer of "Auntie Ethel", named her daughter Ethel Derby Weld even though she knew the name was "out of fashion" at the time. Mrs. Derby was visited by Ethel Weld who was born only weeks before her death.
Derby often referred to herself as "a liberal Republican."

See also
Theodore Roosevelt, father
Edith Carow Roosevelt, mother
Alice Longworth, half-sister
Eleanor Roosevelt, cousin

External links

http://www.nps.gov/sahi/kids.htm
http://www.theodoreroosevelt.org/life/familytree/Ethel.htm
https://web.archive.org/web/20140407074018/http://www.presidentschildren.com/list.htm#26
http://www.findagrave.com/cgi-bin/fg.cgi?page=gr&GSsr=41&GSvcid=129&GRid=5997&
https://timesmachine.nytimes.com/timesmachine/1977/12/12/78838729.pdf
http://www.theodore-roosevelt.com/ethel.html 

1891 births
1977 deaths
19th-century American women
20th-century American women
Ethel Derby
Schuyler family
American Red Cross personnel
Children of presidents of the United States
Children of vice presidents of the United States
Bulloch family
People from Long Island
Female nurses in World War I
American women in World War I
World War II nurses
National Cathedral School alumni
New York (state) Republicans